HC Erlangen is a handball club from Erlangen, Germany. They currently compete in the Handball-Bundesliga.

History
In the 2000/2001 season, both HG Erlangen and CSG Erlangen played in the 2. Handball-Bundesliga, but this season CSG Erlangen dropped out due to a licensing problem, so the club decided to merge with its neighbor, HG Erlangen, which is already in the 2. Handball-Bundesliga. The new club was formed and was named HC Erlangen. They reached the DHB-Pokal FINAL4 in 2022, but lost their semi-final match against SC Magdeburg 30—22.

Accomplishments
2. Handball-Bundesliga: 1
: 2016

Crest, colours, supporters

Kit manufacturers

Kits

Sports hall information

Name: – Arena Nürnberger Versicherung
City: – Nürnberg
Capacity: – 8308
Address: – Kurt-Leucht-Weg 11, 90471 Nürnberg, Germany

Team

Current squad
Squad for the 2022–23 season

Technical staff
 Head Coach:  Raúl Alonso
 Assistant Coach:  Thomas Hankel
 Assistant Coach:  Ólafur Stefánsson

Transfers
Transfers for the 2023–24 season

Joining 
  Jonathan Svensson (LB) (from  Ystads IF)
  Mads Peter Lønborg (RB) (from  KIF Kolding)

Leaving 
  Steffen Fäth (LB)
  Johannes Sellin (RW)

Previous squads

EHF ranking

Former club members

Notable former players

  Nico Büdel (2017–)
  Steffen Fäth (2020–)
  Sebastian Firnhaber (2019–)
  Michael Haaß (2016–2020)
  Nikolas Katsigiannis (2014–2015, 2016–2020)
  Carsten Lichtlein (2019–2020)
  Nikolai Link (2012–)
  Antonio Metzner (2019–)
  Sebastian Preiß (1997–2001, 2013–2016)
  Ole Rahmel (2013–2017)
  Johannes Sellin (2017–)
  Christoph Steinert (2017–2019, 2021–)
  Nicolai Theilinger (2015–2019)
  Steffen Weinhold (2003–2007)
  Martin Ziemer (2020–)
  Ariel Panzer (2004)
  David Szlezak (1999–2001)
  Šime Ivić (2019–2021)
  Stanko Sabljić (2014–2015)
  Pavel Horák (2015–2017)
  Jan Štochl (2013–2016)
  Kim Sonne-Hansen (2022–)
  Sergo Datukashvili (1998–1999)
  Sigurbergur Sveinsson (2014–2015)
  Iso Sluijters (2011)
  Petter Øverby (2018–2022)
  Sergey Gorpishin (2017–2019)
  Igor Lyovshin (2016–2017)
  Uroš Bundalo (2016–2017)
  Klemen Ferlin (2020–)
  Patrik Leban (2021–)
  Gorazd Škof (2017–2019)
  Isaías Guardiola (2016–2018)
  Martin Straňovský (2014–2018)
  Csaba Szücs (2002–2008)
  Marcus Enström (2017–2018)
  Simon Jeppsson (2020–)
  Hampus Olsson (2020–)
  Tobias Rivesjö (2015–2016)
  Oleksandr Hladun (2001–2002)

Former coaches

References

External links
 Official website

German handball clubs
Handball-Bundesliga
Erlangen
Handball clubs established in 2001
2001 establishments in Germany
Sport in Middle Franconia